Henry Cotton  (c.1545–7 May 1615) was an English bishop.

Life
He was the son of Sir Richard Cotton of Warblington, Hampshire, and his wife Jane Onley.

He was a godson to Elizabeth I of England, and one of her chaplains. He was rector of Havant in 1567.

He was elected Bishop of Salisbury on 28 September 1598. He gained Royal Assent on 24 October, was confirmed on 11 November, and consecrated at Lambeth the next day, and had the temporalities restored to him on 23 December 1598. In his time as bishop, a long-running struggle by the city of Salisbury for its charter was resolved, in 1612. 

He died in 1615 and was buried "in his own church" beside his wife, as he had requested in his Will.

Notes

1545 births
1615 deaths
Bishops of Salisbury
16th-century Church of England bishops
English chaplains
Christian chaplains
People educated at Royal Grammar School, Guildford
17th-century Church of England bishops